The 1909–10 Yale Bulldogs men's ice hockey season was the 15th season of play for the program.

Season
Yale recovered from a dismal season the year before but suffered from a lack of consistency, losing after nearly every win.

The team did not have a coach, however, Reginald Roome served as team manager.

Roster

Standings

Schedule and Results

|-
!colspan=12 style="color:white; background:#00356B" | Regular Season

References

Yale Bulldogs men's ice hockey seasons
Yale
Yale
Yale
Yale